Cecilia Bracamonte Chocano (Lima, November 22, 1949) is a Peruvian singer. Her music genre is mainly Peruvian waltz which is the music heard in the main coastal cities. Her singing career spans more than four decades.

OTI Festival 
In 1977 she was selected by América Televisión to represent Peru in the sixth edition of the OTI Festival with a song called "Landó", composed by Chabuca Granda. She was placed joint fifth with three points, confirming her prestige in Peru.

References

External links
biographical information (in Spanish)

1948 births
Living people
20th-century Peruvian women singers
20th-century Peruvian singers
Singers from Lima